is a 1987 racing game released for the PC Engine/TurboGrafx-16, and also available on the Nintendo Wii's Virtual Console and on PlayStation Network. The game depicts the Paris-Dakar Rally, one of the earliest to do so. One of the unique features at the time of release of Victory Run was that the car's parts degraded as they are used and/or abused. Degraded parts could be replaced, but only if the player has the correct type of spare part. The player can acquire up to 20 spare parts before the first race, but cannot acquire any more spare parts after starting the first race.

Reception
Computer and Video Games rated the PC Engine version 80% in 1989.

IGN rated the Virtual Console version 6.5 out of 10 in 2006.

External links

References

1987 video games
Dakar Rally
Hudson Soft games
Off-road racing video games
TurboGrafx-16 games
Video games developed in Japan
Video games scored by Takeaki Kunimoto
Virtual Console games
Virtual Console games for Wii U
PlayStation Network games